Sandra K. Masur is an American cell biologist and activist for women in academia. Masur is a professor of Ophthalmology and Pharmacological Sciences at Icahn School of Medicine at Mount Sinai (ISMMS) in New York City where her biological research focuses on membrane transport and wound healing. As a leader in research surrounding gender equity in science, technology, engineering, mathematics, and medicine (STEMM), Masur also holds titles as the Founding Director of the Office for Women's Careers at ISMMS, the Chair of the Committee on Special Awards, and Title IX Coordinator and had the Senior Leadership Award of the Women in Cell Biology of the American Society for Cell Biology named in her honor.

Early life and education 
Masur was born in New York City. Her parents were Polish Jewish immigrants and helped seed Masur and her sister's academic ambitions. She completed high school at the public High School of Music and Art in NYC, but decided to pursue science after high school. However, to this day, Masur feels that for her, "art and science have always been intertwined" and that her artistic background influences her scientific acumen. Masur completed her undergraduate degree at City College of New York, earning a Bachelor of Arts in biology with a specialization in Aesthetics in 1960.

Masur started her graduate level training at Columbia University in New York City, completing a master's degree in zoology in 1963, followed by a PhD in Cell Biology in 1967. During her PhD, Masur was mentored by Lee Peachy where she studied cellular endocrinology.

Career and research 
Masur was recruited to join Icahn School of Medicine at Mount Sinai's Department of Physiology and Biophysics in 1968. While working part-time as an Instructor, Masur continued a position as a research associate at Columbia University completing her post-doctoral training in cytochemistry.

In Masur's cell biology research, she studies the roles of the extracellular matrix, cell-cell interactions and soluble factors in the wound healing process using a corneal stroma model. Masur's laboratory was funded for 35 years by the National Institutes of Health to explore the hormonal control of membrane transport as well as the cellular mechanisms of wound healing. Her lab's studies of FGF-1 and FGF-2 led to the discovery that these factors promote fibroblast cell type and state transitions in the cornea and that the myofibroblasts and fibroblasts in the cornea are not "terminally differentiated".

Advancing women in academia 
Masur's career has not only been devoted to advancing the understanding of cellular mechanisms of wound healing, but also to advancing and increasing the visibility of women in STEMM. She has used her voice to create opportunities for women in science and move towards a more equitable academic space. During her tenure at Mount Sinai, Masur was promoted to Dean of Faculty Development for her roles in creating mentorship opportunities for women at Mount Sinai. She was an integral member and leader of the Women Faculty Group at Mount Sinai, developed in 1986, which then became the Office for Women's Careers of which Masur was a Founding Director. As the director of the Office of Women's Careers, she advocated for women in her community and organized events to help faculty learn how to juggle a full-time career as well as a family and provide them with mentorship and leadership opportunities.

Beyond the walls of Mount Sinai, Masur held many leadership roles including Chair of Diversity Issues Committee on Women and Minorities for the Association for Research in Vision and Ophthalmology from 1997 to 1999, co-director of the National Eye Institute's "Fundamental Issues in Vision Research" at the Marine Biological Laboratory from 2001 to 2010, and Chair of Women in Cell Biology for the American Society of Cell Biology from 2010 to 2016.

In 2015, for her scientific leadership and her long history of creating opportunities for women, the American Society for Cell Biology named one of their leadership awards the "Sandra K. Masur Senior Leadership Award". The award is built to recognize late career stage faculty with both outstanding scientific achievement and a strong history of leadership in mentoring the careers of men and women in science.

Awards and honors 
 2017 – Elected Fellow of the American Society for Cell Biology
 2015 – Senior Leadership Award of the Women in Cell Biology of the American Society for Cell Biology, named the Sandra K. Masur Leadership Award
 2008 – Jacobi Medallion, Mount Sinai Alumni Association
 2007 – Rosalind Franklin Society Invited Member of Founding Board
 2001 Women in Medicine Silver Achievement Award, Association of American Medical Colleges
 1997 Outstanding Woman Scientist – Association for Women in Science, Metropolitan New York Chapter

Select publications 
 Maltseva O, Folger P, Zekaria D, Petridou S, Masur SK. Fibroblast growth factor reversal of the corneal myofibroblast phenotype. Invest Ophthalmol Vis Sci. 2001 Oct;42(11):2490-5. PMID 11581188.
 Masur, Sandra & Kane, Caroline. (2002). Tapping Science's Women for the Podium. Science. 294. 2480. 10.1126/science.294.5551.2480a.
 Bernstein AM, Twining SS, Warejcka DJ, Tall E, Masur SK. Urokinase receptor cleavage: a crucial step in fibroblast-to-myofibroblast differentiation. Mol Biol Cell. 2007 Jul;18(7):2716-27. doi: 10.1091/mbc.e06-10-0912. Epub 2007 May 16. PMID 17507651; PMCID: PMC1924808.
 Masur, Sandra. (2013). Women in cell biology: A seat at the table and a place at the podium. Molecular biology of the cell. 24. 57–60. 10.1091/mbc.E12-07-0517.
 Masur, Sandra. (2015). Invisible Woman?. Trends in cell biology. 25. 10.1016/j.tcb.2015.06.001.

Personal life 
Masur has a son, Ted Masur, born in 1971. He is a composer.

References 

Living people
Cell biologists
Fellows of the American Society for Cell Biology
Icahn School of Medicine at Mount Sinai faculty
City College of New York alumni
Columbia University alumni
Scientists from New York City
20th-century American zoologists
21st-century American zoologists
Women zoologists